Marko Radulović (born 6 January 2001) is a Croatian-born Serbian professional water polo player for Radnički. He is 6 ft 4 in (1.94 m) tall and weighs 207 lb (94 kg).

Career
He began playing with youth categories of VK Primorje and made senior club debut at the age of 15. He stayed with the club for two seasons since then. In October 2018, he moved to the Serbian club Vojvodina. In the summer of 2020, he moved to Radnički.

International career
After playing with the youth categories of the Croatia men's national water polo team, in October 2020 he decided to move to the Serbia men's national water polo team.

References

External links
 
 Marko Radulović at rwp-league.com

Living people
2001 births
Sportspeople from Rijeka
Serbian male water polo players
Serbs of Croatia